Llukë Bogdani (16?? - 1687) was an Ottoman poet of Albanian origin.

Life 
Born near Prizren he studied in the Catholic school of Yanova (now Janjevo), joined the Austrian forces during the Great Turkish War under the guidance of his cousin Archbishop Pjetër Bogdani and died near Kaçanik in 1687.  An eight-line poem titled Pjetër Bogdanit, argjupeshkëpit Skupsë, kushërinit tim dashunit (Lit. To my dear cousin Pjetër Bogdani, Archbishop of Skopje) and written by Llukë Bogdani was published in the first version Cuneus Prophetarum in 1685. Pjetër Bogdani apparently polished the verses of panegyric improvised by Llukë. In later versions of the work the poem was removed as it was considered laudatory, and thus religiously inappropriate.

References 

 

1687 deaths
People from Prizren
Albanian Roman Catholics
17th-century Albanian people
17th-century poets from the Ottoman Empire
Year of birth unknown
Albanian male poets
17th-century Albanian poets
Male poets from the Ottoman Empire
17th-century male writers